Juan Enrique Carreño López (born September 16, 1968) is a retired Chilean football forward. He was nicknamed Candonga.

Player career

Club career
A product of Colo-Colo youth system, Carreño played mostly of his career in Chilean clubs, but in 1994 he had short spell in Mexican team Pumas de la UNAM. He was known for his hard temper, which was noted in a match between Huachipato and Provincial Osorno in September 1998, where he punched the rival goalkeeper Hernán Caputto.

National team
Carreño was part of the Chile national under-20 football team that finished fourth in the 1987 FIFA World Youth Championship, played in Chile.

For the adult team, Carreño made 10 appearances between 1993 and 1998. Carreño scored a goal against Bolivia in the 1998 World Cup qualifiers that qualified Chile for the 1998 World Cup. However, he was not selected for the final squad that went to France.

Coaching career
From 2009 to 2011, he was the head coach of Colchagua in the Chilean Tercera A. In 2012 he assumed as the coach of General Velásquez and returned to the club in 2015, when he had to leave the charge because of health issues.

Personal life
He is well-known by his nickname Candonga, due to his liking for parties and nocturnal life.

References

External links
 
 
 Juan Carreño at playmakerstats.com (English version of ceroacero.es)

1969 births
Living people
People from San Fernando, Chile
Chilean footballers
Chilean expatriate footballers
Chile international footballers
Chile under-20 international footballers
Chilean Primera División players
Primera B de Chile players
Liga MX players
Colo-Colo footballers
Unión San Felipe footballers
Deportes Linares footballers
Deportes Colchagua footballers
Ñublense footballers
Naval de Talcahuano footballers
Cobresal footballers
Coquimbo Unido footballers
Everton de Viña del Mar footballers
Unión Española footballers
Club Universidad Nacional footballers
Cobreloa footballers
Deportes Concepción (Chile) footballers
C.D. Huachipato footballers
Deportes Iquique footballers
Santiago Morning footballers
Chilean expatriate sportspeople in Mexico
Expatriate footballers in Mexico
Doping cases in association football
Association football forwards
Chilean football managers